French football club SC Bastia's 2004–05 season. Finished 19th place in league and relegated to Ligue 2. Top scorer of the season, including 7 goals in 7 league matches have been Youssouf Hadji. Was eliminated to Coupe de France end of 64, the Coupe de la Ligue was able to be among the final 16 teams.

Transfers

In

Out

Squad

Ligue 1

League table

Results summary

Results by round

Matches

Coupe de France

Coupe de la Ligue

Statistics

Top scorers

League top assists

References 

SC Bastia seasons
Bastia